Mohammad Karim Pirnia (16 September 1920 – 31 August 1997) was an Iranian architectural historian and architect.

Early life
Born in Yazd, Iran, he studied at what came to be Tehran University School of Fine Arts.

Works
Pirnia, a student of traditional Iranian architect, was the one of the early architectural historians that developed a modern language to describe Iranian traditional architecture. His most prominent thoughts were later compiled as books and articles; among them “The Principles of Iranian Architecture” and “The Stylistics of Iranian Architecture” were more widely acclaimed. In the first one, he proposes five principles and in the latter, he defines six historical styles (sabk) for Iranian architecture.

References

External links
Weblog dedicated to the memory of Karim Pir-nia

Iranian architectural historians
University of Tehran alumni
People from Nain, Iran
1920 births
1997 deaths
20th-century  Iranian historians
20th-century Iranian architects